Pavel Petrovich Tomilin (born 7 November 1985) is a former Russian professional football player.

Club career
He played in the Russian Football National League for FC Mordovia Saransk in 2004.

External links
 
 Career summary by sportbox.ru
 

1985 births
People from Saransk
Living people
Russian footballers
Association football defenders
FC Mordovia Saransk players
FC Metallurg Lipetsk players
FC Tambov players
FC Dynamo Bryansk players
Sportspeople from Mordovia